The Huawei U8230 is a touchscreen mobile phone that runs on Android. The brand targets the mid-end phone market. The phone is distributed in Portugal by TMN as TMN A1.

See also
 Galaxy Nexus
 List of Android devices

External links

 Official website

Android (operating system) devices
Huawei smartphones
Mobile phones introduced in 2009
Discontinued smartphones